Moonlighting is an American comedy-drama television show created in 1985 by writer Glenn Gordon Caron.  It centers on Maddie Hayes (Cybill Shepherd), a former model who loses most of her financial assets due to her accountant's embezzlement but unexpectedly finds that she owns a detective agency.  She teams up with cocky, chauvinistic investigator David Addison (Bruce Willis) to run the agency and becomes embroiled in various unusual cases.  The show's other regular characters are Agnes DiPesto (Allyce Beasley), the agency's receptionist, and Herbert Viola (Curtis Armstrong), one of the agency's investigators, who was introduced in the third season and became a featured character in the fourth season.  The show mixes drama, comedy and romance, and often incorporates fantasy sequences or breaks the fourth wall.

The series premiered on ABC in the United States with a feature-length pilot episode on March 3, 1985.  The series lasted 5 seasons, but only 66 episodes were produced, a low figure for American television, for which a full season normally includes at least 22 episodes.  The show became notorious for failing to have a new episode ready to air each week, due to on-set problems including script issues and friction between actors and producers.  Most episodes aired on Tuesday nights, although when the show returned in April 1989 after a two-month hiatus, the remaining episodes aired on Sunday nights.

During its early years, the series was popular with viewers and broke into the top ten of the Nielsen ratings in its third season.  When Maddie and David ended more than two years of sexual tension by sleeping together in that season's highly publicized penultimate episode, "I Am Curious… Maddie", it drew an audience of 60 million viewers.  The show was also a critical hit, receiving 16 Emmy Award nominations in 1986.  Ratings declined, however, in the later seasons, and the show was canceled in 1989.

Series overview

Episodes

Season 1 (1985)

Season 2 (1985–1986)

Season 3 (1986–1987)

Season 4 (1987–1988)

Season 5 (1988–1989)

References

External links 
 
 

Lists of American action television series episodes
Lists of American comedy-drama television series episodes
Lists of American crime television series episodes

it:Moonlighting